Pterostylis clavigera, commonly known as the hairy snail orchid is a species of orchid which is endemic to New South Wales. It has a rosette of leaves at its base, and when flowering, a single narrow, bright green and white flower on a rough flowering stem.

Description
The dorsal sepal and petals are fused, forming a hood or "galea" over the column, the sepal and petals with a short, nearly horizontal point on the end. The lateral sepals almost close off the front of the flower and the sinus between them has a dark green central area. Flowering occurs from June to September.

Taxonomy and naming
Pterostylis clavigera was first formally described in 1885 by Robert D. FitzGerald and the description was published in Journal of Botany, British and Foreign. The specific epithet (clavigera) is a Latin word meaning "club-bearing".

Distribution and habitat
The hairy snail orchid grows in shrubland, woodland and rocky slopes between Mudgee and Dubbo and in nearby areas.

References

clavigera
Endemic orchids of Australia
Orchids of New South Wales
Plants described in 1885